Farm to Market Road 960 (FM 960) is a state highway in the U.S. state of Texas that stays within Wharton County. The two-lane road starts at Future Business Interstate 69 (Future Bus. I-69)/Business U.S. Route 59-S (Bus 59) northeast of El Campo, goes in a northerly direction through farmlands and ends at FM 102 at Glen Flora.

Route description
FM 960 begins at Future Bus. I-69/Bus 59 northeast of El Campo and heads to the northeast. Within a short distance the highway crosses Future Interstate 69 (Future I-69)/U.S. Route 59 (US 59) at an overpass. Connections with Future I-69/US 59 are complex. Southbound Future I-69/US 59 traffic desiring to access FM 960 must exit to a feeder road and then use a special connecting road. Northbound Future I-69/US 59 traffic can use the Future Bus. I-69/Bus 59 exit to access FM 960. To enter Future I-69/US 59 northbound, FM 960 traffic must take Future Bus. I-69/Bus 59 north. To enter Future I-69/US 59 southbound, FM 960 traffic can use the special connecting road to the feeder, which leads to an entrance ramp. From Future Bus. I-69/Bus 59, FM 960 heads to the northwest for  before turning to the northeast. After an additional  the highway comes to an intersection with FM 961 at the Wharton County Youth Fair Grounds. In the last stretch, the highway briefly turns sharply to the southeast before veering back to the northeast and crossing the Colorado River.

History
On June 30, 1976 the old US 59 right-of-way was redesignated Loop 525. On April 25, 1997, Loop 525 was canceled and its right-of-way transferred to Bus 59-S.

Major intersections

See also

References

0960
Transportation in Wharton County, Texas